Ron Fortunato is an American film and television cinematographer and a television director. His credits include Nil by Mouth, Sunset Strip, Hachiko: A Dog's Story and 100 Centre Street. From 2009 to 2010, he directed two episodes of Gossip Girl. He has been a member of the American Society of Cinematographers since 1998.

In 2001, he was nominated for Outstanding Cinematography for a Multi-Camera Series at the Primetime Emmy Awards for his work on 100 Centre Street.

References

External links

American cinematographers
American television directors
Living people
Place of birth missing (living people)
Year of birth missing (living people)